Jebalbarez (also Romanized as Jebālbārez and Jebāl Bārez) is a city and capital of Jebalbarez District, in Jiroft County, Kerman Province, Iran.  At the 2006 census, its population was 2,639, in 576 families.

References

Populated places in Jiroft County

Cities in Kerman Province